Gelo may refer to:

 Gelo or Gelon (died 478 BC), ruler of Gela and Syracuse (5th century BC)
 Gelo, son of Hiero II (died 216 BC) of Syracuse
 The Gelao people, a nationality of China
 Gelo Racing, a racing team named for Georg Loos
 Gelonus, a Scythian city
 Gelo, Mozambique, a number of towns in Mozambique
 Gelo di melone, a jellied watermelon pudding
 Gelo (film), a 2016 Indian film
 LiAngelo Ball (born 1998), American basketball player nicknamed "Gelo"
 Gelo (dish), a French gelatin based pudding